Cathays Park or Cardiff Civic Centre is a civic centre area in the city centre of Cardiff, the capital city of Wales, consisting of a number of early 20th century buildings and a central park area, Alexandra Gardens. It includes Edwardian buildings such as the Temple of Peace, City Hall, the National Museum and Gallery of Wales and several buildings belonging to the Cardiff University campus. It also includes Cardiff Crown Court, the administrative headquarters of the Welsh Government, and the more modern Cardiff Central police station. The Pevsner architectural guide to the historic county of Glamorgan judges Cathays Park to be "the finest civic centre in the British Isles". The area falls within the Cathays electoral ward.

History
Cathays Park was formerly part of Cardiff Castle grounds. The present day character of the area owes much to successive holders of the title the Marquess of Bute, and especially the 3rd Marquess of Bute, an extremely successful and wealthy businessman. They acquired much of the lands in Cathays through investment and by inheritance through a marriage to Charlotte Windsor in 1766.

The idea of acquiring the Cathays House park as an open public space was raised in 1858 and again in 1875. In 1887 it was suggested the park could commemorate Queen Victoria's Golden Jubilee. Negotiations didn't begin until 1892, when Lord Bute agreed to sell 38 acres for £120,000 (equivalent to £ in ). The idea of relocating the Town Hall to the park was controversial, but it was also proposed to locate a new University College building there.

On 14 December 1898, the local council bought the entire  of land for £161,000 from the Marquess of Bute (equivalent to £ in ). As part of the sale, the 3rd Marquis of Bute placed strict conditions on how the land was to be developed. The area was to be used for civic, cultural and educational purposes, and the avenues were to be preserved.

A six-month Cardiff Fine Arts, Industrial and Maritime Exhibition which included specially constructed boating lake, a wooden cycling track and an electric railway was held in 1896.

In 1897 a competition was held for a complex comprising Law Courts and a Town Hall, with Alfred Waterhouse, architect of the Natural History Museum in London, as judge. The winners were the firm of Lanchester, Stewart and Rickards, who would later go on to design the Methodist Central Hall in Westminster. These were the first two buildings of the ensemble, and have an almost uniform façade treatment. The east and west pavilions of both façades are identical in design, except for the attic storeys, which are decorated with allegorical sculptural groups. On the Crown Court these are Science and Industry, sculpted by Donald McGill, and Commerce and Industry, by Paul Raphael Montford, while on the City Hall are Music and Poetry by Paul Montford and Unity and Patriotism by Henry Poole.

The third site in this complex went empty until 1910, when the competition for a National Museum of Wales was won by the architects Smith and Brewer. The design parts from the Edwardian Baroque of the Law Courts and City Hall and is more akin to American Beaux-Arts architecture, particularly in the entrance hall where a similarity to McKim, Mead and White's later Metropolitan Museum of Art in New York City has been noted. The Museum site was not bounded to the north by an avenue so there were scarcely any limits on the depth of the building; the 1910 plan was almost twice as deep as it was broad. The First World War, however, ensured that progress on the building was very slow. By 1927 part of the East range, with the lecture theatre funded by William Reardon Smith, was complete. Further extensions came only in the 1960s and 1990s; these remained faithful to the original design on the exterior (and included sculpture by Dhruva Mistry) but are of a neutral character on the inside.

Due to presence of the then Welsh Office building, by the 1990s 'Cathays Park' became used by some as a metonym for that Government Department, and after devolution in 1999, for the Welsh Government's civil servants and ministerial offices.

Buildings

Gardens

In addition to the large lawn in front of the City Hall, Cathays Park includes three formal gardens and a tree lined park. Main phases of construction of the gardens were from 1903 to 1906 and from 1924 to 1928. The gardens are grade II on the Register of Parks and Gardens of Special Historic Interest in Wales. All of the spaces are within conservation areas and many of the surrounding buildings are listed. The open spaces are very important to the image of the city. Several important buildings overlook these well kept spaces. Each of the three gardens has its own very different character and each retains its original layout.

Alexandra Gardens

Named after Alexandra of Denmark, the queen consort of Edward VII. The gardens were first called University Gardens, and were laid out and planted in 1903. Alexandra Gardens is  garden located at the heart of the civic centre. It consists of maintained flower beds and grass, with the Welsh National War Memorial standing at its centre.

Gorsedd Gardens
The garden was originally known as Druidical Gardens, but the name Gorsedd Gardens was later adopted. The  garden has as its centrepiece a stone circle constructed in 1899, when the National Eisteddfod of Wales was held in Cardiff. The stones were originally erected elsewhere in Cathays Park for the National Eisteddfod of 1899. They were re-erected in the garden in 1905. The garden's name refers to the Gorsedd of Welsh Bards, the ceremonial order that governs the Eisteddfod. Work on the landscaped gardens began in 1904 and opened to the public in 1910. It is laid out with lawns, and tree and shrub borders and hedges. The gardens has statues of subjects including David Lloyd George and Lord Ninian Crichton-Stuart.

Friary Gardens
The  garden is a style of formal garden formerly known as a Dutch Garden. It was begun in 1904 and completed in 1906. It contains a statue constructed in honour of the 3rd Marquess of Bute by James Pittendrigh Macgillivray and erected in 1928.

Queen Anne Square
Queen Anne Square is a tree-lined grass park, which was built in the 1930s and 1950s. It was designed to be aligned with the main thoroughfare of King Edward VII Avenue, on a site that was originally planned for a Welsh Parliament House. The square is enclosed by a tree-lined no through road, by Corbett Road to the south and by Aberdare Hall to the south east.

Sculpture

Memorial stones

Gates, colonnades and obelisks

References

Further reading

External links

Cathays Park on the Cardiff Council website 
Cathays Park Conservation Area

 
Politics of Cardiff
Districts of Cardiff
Landmarks in Cardiff
Parks in Cardiff
Castle, Cardiff
Registered historic parks and gardens in Cardiff